Chichewa (also but less commonly known as Chinyanja, Chewa or Nyanja) is the main lingua franca of central and southern Malawi and neighbouring regions. Like other Bantu languages it has a wide range of tenses. In terms of time, Chichewa tenses can be divided into present, recent past, remote past, near future, and remote future. The dividing line between near and remote tenses is not exact, however. Remote tenses cannot be used of events of today, but near tenses can be used of events earlier or later than today.

The Chichewa tense system also incorporates aspectual distinctions. Except for the Present Simple, nearly every tense in Chichewa is either perfective (for example, "I went") or imperfective in aspect (for example "I was going", "I used to go"). In the present tense only, there is a distinction between habitual ("I usually go") and progressive ("I am going now").

Another aspectual distinction in Chichewa is that between perfect and past. A perfect tense is one which carries an implication that the result of a past action still holds at the present time, for example "he has come (and is still here)". The past tenses in Chichewa tend to be discontinuous, for example, "he came (but has now gone)". They differ from the English past tense, which is neutral in this regard.

Often two different tenses, such as  "I was going" and  "I go", have the same tense-marker but are distinguished by their tonal pattern.

Compound tenses are also found in Chichewa to express more complex meanings, such as  "I was about to go" or  "I have been going".

In addition to ordinary tenses, Chichewa also has tenses to express obligation ("I should go"), potentiality ("I might go"), and persistence ("I am still going"). There are also tenses with meanings such as "while I am going", "after I had gone", "before I went", as well as a series of conditional-clause tenses meaning "if..." such as "if I go", "if I had gone", "if I were to go" and so on.

Formation of the tenses

Basic tense formation
These infixes which distinguish the tenses are known as "tense-markers".

Three tenses (the Present Simple, Present Subjunctive, and Present Imperative) have no tense-marker. The Present Simple in most verbs has a near future meaning:
 "I (will) help"
 "I should help"
 "help!"

Hyphens and tonal accent marks have been added for clarity, although they are not used in standard Chichewa orthography.

All other tenses have a tense-marker, which is added directly after the subject-marker. For example, the Present Continuous is made by adding the tense-marker . There are six possible subject-markers mostly referring to persons:

 "I am helping"
 "you (sg.) are helping"
 "he or she is helping"
 "we are helping"
 "you (pl. or polite) are helping"
 "they are helping / he or she (polite) is helping"

In modern standard Chichewa there is no difference between the 3rd person singular "he/she" and the 3rd person plural "they" except in the Perfect tense, although there are some dialects such as the Town Nyanja spoken in Lusaka, Zambia, where the 3rd person plural is still , and thus differs from the singular. The singular and plural also differ in the Perfect tense (see below).

Freestanding pronouns such as  "I",  "you",  "he, she" are available and may be added for emphasis, but are usually omitted:  "I am helping".

In addition to the above subject-markers mostly referring mostly to persons there are also other subject-markers usually referring to things, animals, or the impersonal "it" or "there" of place or time:
 "it is helping" (e.g.  "the chicken")
 "it is helping" (e.g.  "maize")
 "they are helping" (e.g.  "my goats")
 "it is cold"

The Perfect tense is exceptional in that the subject-marker is shortened when followed by the tense-marker .
 "I have helped"
 "you (sg.) have helped"
 "he/she has helped"
 "we have helped"
 "you (pl. or polite) have helped"
 "they have helped" (or "he/she (polite) has helped")

Other elements can be added between the tense-marker and the verb-stem, such as aspect-markers and object-markers. For example the object-marker  "him" or "her" can be added to any of the above verbs:  "I have helped him/her".

Tonal patterns

The second way in which one tense is distinguished from another in Chichewa is in the use of tones, that is, in the rise and fall in pitch of the speaker's voice. Each tense is associated with a particular tonal melody, and in some cases two tenses which share the same tense-marker can be distinguished by tones.

In their book, The Phonology of Chichewa, Downing and Mtenje identify eight different patterns for positive verbs, in addition to further patterns for negative and relative clause verbs.

Often the same tonal pattern is used by more than one tense. For instance, the Present Continuous, Recent Past, and Imperfect all have a high tone on the syllable following the tense-marker:
 "I am helping"
 "I helped (just now)"
 "I was helping"

Another tonal pattern, used in the Present Habitual tense, is to place one high tone on the subject-marker and another on the penultimate syllable:
 "I (usually) help"

The Past Simple (Remote Perfect) has a tone on the tense-marker itself, which in some dialects spreads to the following syllable:
 or  "I helped"

Some tenses, such as the Potential, are pronounced with every syllable low:
 "I can help"

The same tonal pattern is used in every verb. However, when the verb is a short one of one or two syllables only, certain adjustments may be made. For example, in the Present Habitual, the second tone is heard on the final when the verb stem has only one syllable:
 "I usually read" (second tone on the penultimate)
 "I usually eat" (second tone on the final)

But in certain tenses, a penultimate tone remains penultimate, even if the verb is monosyllabic:
 "he has not yet gone"
 "he has not yet eaten"

For further details concerning the tonal patterns of verbs of different lengths, see the article Chichewa tones.

In negative tenses different tonal patterns are used. For example, in the negative subjunctive, the tone moves to the penultimate:
 "you should go"
 "you shouldn't go"

Some tenses have two different negative intonations, depending on the meaning. For example, the Simple Past (Remote Perfect)  "I bought" has the following negatives with different meanings:
 (or ) "I didn't buy it"
 "I haven't bought it yet"

Certain tenses also have a different tonal pattern when used in a positive relative clause. For example, the potential tense is normally toneless, but in a relative clause it acquires a tone on the first and penultimate syllables.
 "they can explain to us"
 "who can explain to us"

Not all tenses change their tonal pattern in a relative clause. Negative tenses do not change, and those positive tenses which already have a tone on the first syllable do not change.

In addition to the tones added to the verb by the tonal pattern of the tense, some verb-stems and certain suffixes have their own tone, which is heard on the final syllable. This tone is not heard, however, in tenses such as the Present Habitual where the tonal pattern places a tone on the penultimate syllable. The distinction is also lost in the subjunctive, where the tonal pattern places a tone on the final even in low-toned stems:
 "I have helped"
 "I have run"
 "I usually help"
 "I usually run"
 "I should help"
 "I should run"

Another factor affecting the tones of a verb is that when a verb is followed by an object or a place-argument, the tone usually spreads:
 "you stay"
 "where do you live?"

Aspect-Markers
Following the tense-marker it is possible to add one or more aspect-markers, which are infixes which modify the meaning of the tense. A fifth aspect-marker  is less commonly found.

can be used in its own right as a tense-marker to make the imperfect tense:
 "I was helping" (with tone on the syllable following )

It can also be added to other tenses or to the infinitive to make the aspect habitual:
 "don't do", vs.  "don't keep on doing"
 "if I buy", vs.  "whenever I buy"
 "I'll help", vs.  "I help regularly"
 "to help", vs.  "to help regularly"

 "he went and bought some petrol"

Sometimes it can mean "go in order to":
 "we will pray" vs.  "we will go and pray"

In combination with the Present Simple tense it makes the Contingent Future (see below):
"perhaps he'll help me (if I ask him)."

The infix  has various meanings. The first meaning is "come and...":
 "come and see!"

With an Infinitive or Subjunctive after a verb of coming, it can mean "in order to":
 "to help" vs.  "I have come to help".

The second meaning is or "at a later time, in future":
 "it would have caused him problems" vs.  "it would have caused him problems later"

When combined with the Present Simple tense, it converts it to the Remote Future:
 "I will help" (tomorrow or later)

The aspect-marker  means "just". As it is derived from the Infinitive, the tone, as in the Infinitive itself, goes on the syllable following , and the final vowel is always , never :
 "I wanted", vs.  "I just wanted".

Mchombo gives this example:
"You go ahead, while I (continue to) complete this job."

The similarity in meaning suggests that it may derive from the idiom  "I'll begin by finishing".

For examples of this aspect-marker used with the subjunctive and imperative, see below.

Time and aspect of tenses
Chichewa makes distinctions which are sometimes not found in other languages, for example, the distinction between near and remote past, or between perfective and imperfect aspect. Some tenses, such as the toneless  tense, are used only to make conditional or temporal clauses.

Near and remote tenses
However, although the remote tenses are never used for events of today, the opposite is not true. As one scholar Jack Mapanje puts it: "Although traditional and other grammarians have latched on to the idea of immediate, near or remote past or future time, this is not a hard and fast rule for our languages. Usually the decision as to how immediate, near or remote past or future time is from the speech time is dependent on subjective factors."

Present tenses

Present Simple
The Present Simple tense is formed without any tense-marker, but with a tone on the subject-prefix:  "I will help". In a verb of three or more syllables, the first tone often spreads, making .

The Present Simple of the verb  ("is") is irregular, in that it has no tone on the subject prefix:  "I am". But the tone on the first syllable is heard when the verb is used in a relative clause.

The Present Simple tense can be both perfective and imperfective in aspect. When the Present Simple is perfective, the meaning is usually immediate future (see below):
"I'll carry the bags, don't trouble yourself."

It can sometimes, however, be used perfectively referring to the present, for example in stage directions in a play:
"The tailor comes out of the shop."

It is also possible for the Present Simple to have an imperfective meaning. This was common in early Chichewa, but avoided today, as these two versions of the Bible illustrate:
. (1922 translation)"The wind blows where it will."
. (1998 translation)"The wind blows where it will (lit. usually blows to where it is wanting)."

With a non-dynamic verb such as "I love", "I know", "I want", "I believe", "I hope" and so on, the Present Simple can be used even today with present meaning:
"I believe (I hope) you are well."

However, even with these verbs, it is more common these days to use the Present Continuous or Present Habitual instead.

Negative Present Simple
The Negative Present Simple tense (with tones on the first two syllables) can be used for the negative of a stative verb:
"I don't know how to drive a car."

At other times it has a habitual meaning, and some authors consider it as being the negative of the Present Habitual. In the following example, the Present Habitual is used for the positive, but the Present Simple for the negative:
"We eat sour-plums but we don't eat bitter-apples."

With negative monosyllabic verbs, the present continuous is sometimes used, even though the meaning is habitual:
"Many Malawians don't drink alcohol."

When the negative present simple has a future meaning, the tones change, and in common with other future tenses it has a single tone on the penultimate:  "I won't help".

In relative clauses, both negative and positive, the tones are the same as in ordinary statements.

Present Habitual
The Present Habitual tense ( "I help, habitually") is formed by adding  to the Present Simple tense. The tones are on the subject-marker and penultimate; the first tone never spreads. In relative clauses the tones do not change.

The Present Habitual is typically used for situations in the present which are repeated habitually or which are continuous and expected to continue indefinitely:
"When it rains, the rivers get full."
"I live in Lilongwe."

As noted above, the negative of this tense usually omits . However, the infix  (with a tone) can be added especially if the meaning is emphatic:
."I never complain".

The tense-marker  appears to derive from an earlier . (-mba- is also used as a habitual marker in the Malawian variety of Chisena.) Kanerva (1990) records forms like  "I cook", showing a long vowel in the first syllable in the Nkhotakota dialect; however, other dialects have a short vowel.

Present Continuous
The Present Continuous (or Present Progressive) tense uses the tense-marker , with the tone on the syllable immediately after :  "I am helping". The negative also has a tone in the same place:  "I am not helping".

It is used much like the English present continuous for temporary situations which are not expected to continue for long. It can also be used, as in English, for events which are already planned, e.g. "I'm going to Zambia next week" or which are still incompleted but under way:
 "I'm going to the market." (now)
."I'm going home tomorrow."
"He's building a kitchen at his house."

This tense is used in a wider range of contexts than the English equivalent, since it is also often used with stative verbs such as "know", "want", "remember", "believe", "expect", "think", "see":
"Do you think that I don't know?"
"What do you mean?"

It is also used for performative verbs, such as  "I promise", although some older speakers use the Present Simple in such contexts.

In some contexts the Present Continuous can be used where English uses the Perfect Continuous:
"Since the devaluation of the currency things have been getting difficult."

Present Frequentative
A frequentative version of the Present Continuous tense can be made by combining the tense-marker  with the aspect-marker . It is generally used for situations which the speaker disapproves of.
 "They are always causing a disturbance with radios."

Present Persistive
(This tone moves to the final in monosyllabic verbs.) It is most often used with the verb  "be". With other verbs the tendency is to replace this tense with the suffix  "still":  "I am still helping", but this suffix is not available with the verb , since  has a different meaning, namely "I do not have".
"The girl is still suffering."
"Wages are still low."

The verb has a tone on the penultimate:
"She's still in bed."
"I found the taxi still waiting."

For the participial form of the persistive tense, see below.

Perfect tense
A perfect tense is usually defined as one which indicates the continuing present relevance of a past situation. Thus the use of the Perfect tense in the sentence "I have lost my penknife" indicates that the penknife is still missing.

Several different typical uses of perfect tenses are distinguished in linguistics textbooks: the Perfect of Result (e.g. "I have lost my penknife"); the Experiential Perfect (e.g. "Bill has been to America (at least once)"); the Perfect of Persistent Situation (e.g. "I've been waiting for hours"); and the Perfect of Recent Past (e.g. "I've seen her this morning"). All of these uses can be found in the Chichewa Perfect.

In English, the use of the Perfect is incompatible with a time adverb referring to a time completely in the past (e.g. "yesterday"). However, this is not necessarily the case in all languages; in Spanish, for example, the Perfect is compatible with an adverb such as  "yesterday". As will be seen below, Chichewa may also combine the Perfect with a past time adverb.

The Perfect Simple tense in Chichewa is formed as described above with the tense-marker , e.g.  "I have bought (some)". It is toneless, unless the verb-stem itself has a tone (e.g.  "I am tired"). There is no exact negative, although a particular intonation of the negative past with the tone on the penultimate only is often regarded as the equivalent of a negative Perfect ( "I haven't bought it yet").

Perfect of result
As with the English Perfect, the Perfect tense is often used as a perfect of result, usually referring to very recent events:
"Oh no! My phone's been stolen!" (implying that it is still lost)

Unlike the English Perfect, it is possible to combine it with an adverb of time such as "at ten o'clock":
"We found him at ten o'clock."

Perfect of experience
As in English also it can be used as a Perfect of experience to describe something which has happened once or more and which may happen again:
"I've been back to Chitipa three times."

Adding the suffix  gives the meaning "at times" or "sometimes":
"I myself have at times seen people doing this."

Perfect with present meaning
A usage of the perfect tense unfamiliar in English but common in other Bantu languages such as Swahili is to express a present state resulting from a recent event. For example, "he is wearing a suit" is expressed in Chichewa as "he has put on a suit"; "he is sitting on a chair" is expressed as "he has sat down on a chair"; "I am tired" is expressed as "I have become tired", and so on.
. "He's wearing a suit." (literally "he has put on a suit")
 "Those mangoes are ripe." (lit. "have ripened")
 "I am tired." (lit. "I have become tired")
"She's sitting in the kitchen (right now)"
"How is it possible?"
"This money is (too) little."
"There are (too) many people."
"How is living in a grass-roofed house different from living in one with a tin roof?"

To express the past version of such situations ("he was wearing a suit") the Recent Past or Remote Past is used.

Perfect continuous meaning
The Perfect tense of the verb  ("stay" or "be") either by itself or combined with another verb is used as the equivalent of the English Perfect Continuous to express a situation which began some time ago but which is still continuing now:
 "I've been here for five months."
 "We've been working since Monday."
"He has been standing for many hours."

Relative clause intonation of Perfect
The relative clause intonation of the Perfect Simple has a tone on the first syllable (which may link or spread) and another on the penultimate (which may shift).

It may be used as an adjective:
"Last year (lit. the year which has finished)."
"Last month (lit. that month which has gone)."

It can also be used as a noun, with the noun it describes being understood:
."The deceased (person)."
"The (person) sitting on the chair is who?"
"This (radio station) which you have opened is Z.B.S.", i.e. "You are listening to the Z.B.S."

Thirdly it can be used in a construction with any tense of the verb  "begin" to mean "begin by doing":
"Eat some  first, then let's talk." (literally, "begin (when) you have eaten ")
"Before we say anything else, let's start by seeing the girl."

Remote Perfect (Simple Past)

and 
The difference is partly regional, since  is heard mainly in parts of the Central Region, especially in the area around Lilongwe, while  is used in the Southern Region. Since the first President of Malawi, Hastings Kamuzu Banda, wished to standardise the language and to make the Central Region variety the basis of that standard,  was chosen as the correct form to be used in written Chichewa for this tense. Banda is said to have declared: "The real Chichewa is what is spoken by the villagers in Dowa, Lilongwe, Dedza, Salima; in the Southern Region, Namkumba's area in Fort Johnston." Thus  has come to be used as the standard form in written Chichewa, and books describing the language for Malawian schools allow only  as the Remote Perfect tense-marker. Colloquially, however,  seems to be more common, and is the form given for this tense in the majority of publications describing Chichewa grammar.

The tone is on the tense-marker itself. In longer verbs in some dialects this tone spreads forward one syllable:  /  "he/she (has) received". In relative clauses, the tones are on the first syllable and penultimate:  or  "(he who) received".

This tense is sometimes referred to as the "Past" or "Simple Past".  However, the descriptions given by several authors make it clear that, except in its use in narrative, it should be classified as one of the perfect tenses, since like the Perfect it usually carries the implication that the effect of the action still holds. Watkins calls it the "Remote Past With Present Influence". It refers to events of yesterday or earlier.

Remote Perfect of result
One common use is as a perfect of result, referring to an event which happened before today, but whose result is still true at the time of speaking:
"He came some time ago (and is still here)."
"He went home (supposes that he did not turn back)."
"He has eaten (and is not now hungry)"

It can be used with a past time adverb such as "yesterday" or "last year". "When this happens the 'perfect meaning' of the utterance is not lost" (Mapanje).
"He died last year."

As Watkins noted, this is the appropriate tense to use to describe the creation of the world, since the result of the creation is still evident:
"In the beginning God created the heaven and the earth."

The Remote Perfect can also be used with adverbs such as  "these days" and " "at present" to describe a change that has come about, but not recently:
. "These days football has changed a lot."
."Nowadays these things have become rare."

Remote Perfect of experience
Like the Perfect, it can also be used experientially.
"I have lived in Africa twice."
"I met this man once only."
"Chibambo has taught in various secondary schools."

Remote Perfect in narrative
Another use is in narrative:
"I was walking in the forest. Suddenly I stepped on a snake."

The narrative Remote Perfect is typically used for the action in novels and short stories and in narratives such as the 1998 Bible translation. In this usage, it has the meaning of a simple past tense, and the implication that the result of the action still holds does not apply.

Negative of the Remote Perfect
The negative of this tense has the final vowel . There are two different intonations with different meanings. The second of these, which has a tone on the penultimate syllable only, serves as the negative of the perfect tense:
"I didn't go."
"I haven't gone."

The second of these intonations is also used when the Remote Perfect is used experientially:
"I have never been."

The first of these intonations has tones on both the negative prefix  and the subject marker. In the 3rd person singular and plural, the syllables  usually coalesce to :
"He didn't come."
"He hasn't come yet."

In monosyllabic verbs the intonations are as follows:
"He didn't eat."
"He hasn't eaten yet."

Since the negative of the Recent Past is rarely used in modern Chichewa, the Remote Perfect negative is used instead. When negative, therefore, this tense can refer to events of today as well as events in the more remote past.

Relative clause intonation
When used in a relative clause, the intonation of the verb changes, with one tone on the first syllable (which may spread) and one on the penultimate, which is shifted to the final when the verb has two syllables or one. An object-marker, if present, loses its tone except if the verb is monosyllabic.
"We received this letter which you wrote."
"He does not know what killed his sister."

Past tenses
The past tenses in Chichewa differ from the perfect tenses in that they generally describe situations which were true in the past but of which the results no longer apply at the present time. Thus Maxson describes the Recent Past and the Remote Past as both implying that the situation has been "reversed or interrupted by another action". According to Watkins, the Remote Past tense would be appropriate in a sentence such as "Jesus Christ died (but rose again)"; whereas it would not be appropriate in the sentence "God created the world" since it would imply that the creation was cancelled and "a second creator did a more enduring piece of work". Similarly, according to Kulemeka, the Recent Past would be inappropriate in a sentence such as "our cat died", since it would imply that the act of dying was not permanent but would allow the possibility that the cat could come to life again at some future time.

These two tenses, therefore, appear to differ from the English past tense (which is neutral in implication), and would seem to belong to the category of past tenses known in modern linguistics as discontinuous past. Just as the Perfect and the Past Simple both carry the implication that the action had an enduring effect which continues to the present time, so the Recent Past and Remote Past carry the opposite implication, that the action was not permanent but was reversed or cancelled by a later action.

The Recent Past tense can also be used for narrating events that occurred earlier on the day of speaking. (The use of the Perfect tense for narrative as described by Watkins is now apparently obsolete). However, for narrating a series of events of yesterday or earlier, the Remote Perfect tense is used.

Recent Past
The Recent Past is made with the tense-marker . The tone comes on the syllable immediately after :  "I helped (but...)".

For the Recent Past tense,  is preferred.  is regarded as incorrect by Malawian teachers for events of today, but is sometimes heard colloquially.

The Recent Past is most often used for events of today, but it can also be used of earlier events. Although it can be used for simple narrative of events of earlier today, it usually carries the implication that the result of the action no longer holds true:
 "He went to Zomba, but he has come back."
 "I (had) put it in my pocket (but it isn't there now)."
"He came just now (but has gone away again)."

With the same verbs in which the Perfect tense describes a state in the present, the Recent Past describes a state in the recent past:
 (= )."He was wearing a suit" (literally, "he had put on a suit").
"He was sitting nearby."
"Were you carrying anyone else in the car, sir?"

It can also be used, however, as a simple past tense for narrative of events of earlier today:
. "I was walking in the forest. Suddenly I stepped on a snake."

"I was very pleased."

A negative form of this tense ( "I didn't explain", with a tone following , and with the ending -a) is recorded by Mtenje. However, the negative seems to be rarely if ever used in modern standard Chichewa, and it is not mentioned by most other writers. Instead, the negative of the Remote Perfect (with tones on the first and penultimate, and with the ending -e) is generally used.

Remote Past
For the Remote Past tense, some dialects use  and others .

There are tones on the 1st, 2nd, and penultimate syllables. The first tone or the second tone can be omitted: ;  "I (had) bought (but...)". This tense is a remote one, used of events of yesterday or earlier. The  of the tense-marker is always long, even though it is often written with a single vowel.

."Inside the passport they had stamped a visa."
"A large crowd followed him, because they had seen amazing signs."

It can also be used to describe a situation in the distant past, using the same verbs which are used in the Perfect tense to describe a situation in the present:
"A fat woman was standing outside; in her hand she was carrying a packet of beer."
"I found certain girl sitting on the sand; she was wearing a chitenje."

The same meaning is often expressed with a compound verb:  (see below for examples.)

Another common use of this tense is as a discontinuous past, expressing a situation in the past which later came to be cancelled or reversed:
."I received some coupons but I sold them."
"Her friends tried to stop her but she wouldn't listen."
"The sheep was lost (but has been found)."
"He was born blind (but has regained his sight)."

Imperfect tense
The usual Past Imperfective tense, or simply the Imperfect tense, is made with the tense-marker . The tones are the same as for the Present Continuous and the Recent Past, that is, there is a tone on the syllable immediately after . The negative also has a tone after :  "I wasn't helping". This tense can refer either to very recent time or to remote time in the past:

The imperfect sometimes has a progressive meaning:
"Forgive me. I was doing wrong."
"Ha! Was I dreaming?"
 "At that time where were you coming from?"

It can also be used for habitual events in the past:
. "In class we used to sit together."

The negative also has a tone on the syllable following the infix , as well as one on :
"I didn't know that you had arrived."

Remote Imperfect
Remote Imperfect or Remote Past Imperfective is formed with the tense-marker . It refers to events of yesterday or earlier. Since the Past Imperfective with  can be used of both near and remote events, whereas  can be used only for remote ones, the  tense is perhaps less commonly used.

This tense is used for both habitual events in the distant past, and progressive events in the distant past:
 "Last year he used to go to school, but this year he just stays at home."
. "I was walking in the forest."

The tense-marker , which is pronounced with two syllables, is possibly derived from the verb  or  'go'.

Future tenses

Present Simple as future
The Present Simple, as noted above, is often used for events in the near or immediate future:
"I'll give you a ring when I arrive."

Usually it refers to events of today, but it can also be used for tomorrow or even later times:
"We'll meet tomorrow."
"You'll be fine tomorrow, I promise."

The negative of this tense has a single tone on the penultimate syllable:
"I'm not going to go to the wedding."

Some dialects put a tone on the first two syllables (e.g. "I will help"); more frequently authors report a tone on  only; Downing & Mtenje (2017), pp. 163–4. In longer verbs the tone of  may spread to the following syllable.
"One day I too am going to be a reporter."
"What are you going to do when you leave school?"
"I will love you all my life."
"What are they going to eat at harvest time?"

In the negative, as with most negative future tenses, there is a single tone on the penultimate (in monosyllables the tone is heard on ). All other tones earlier in the word are deleted. Often the meaning of this negative tense is "will never":
"We will never forget him."

Adding  to this tense gives the meaning "never again":
"From that time on I swore that I would never again fall in love."

It usually refers to events in the near future. Maxson characterises this tense as follows: "The sense sometimes seems to be that the action will take place in relation to or dependent on something else. It might presuppose an unspoken conditional clause." The name "Contingent Future" was suggested by Henry (1891), as opposed to the  Future, which he called the "Indefinite Future".
"You'll find me at work (when you come)."
"You'll find the keys with the security guards (if you go there)."
"Perhaps he'll help me (if I ask him)."

The future tense-marker  is not to be confused with the aspect-marker  "go and", which can be used combined with various tenses, for example:
"I'll go and get it from the bank."

Another future tense can be made with the tense-marker , with tones on the initial syllable and penultimate. This usually refers to a situation in the near future, and has an imperfective meaning:
"The train will be leaving soon."

"He will not be representing Malawi again."

In some dialects,  in this tense and the Imperfect Subjunctive becomes .

The  Future is an imperfective tense referring to events that will regularly take place in the distant future. The tones are on the initial syllable (which may spread) and the penultimate:
"What sort of work will it be? How much money will I be getting?"

"We will be going to eat pumpkins."

The tones are on the initial and penultimate syllables:
"When a person is arrogant and overconfident it will usually happen that one day he will be brought down to earth."
"Something that flies generally has one day when it will usually happen that it will come down to land."

Potential tenses

Present Potential
The Present Potential is made with the tense-marker  and the final vowel . It is toneless, unless the verb-stem itself has a tone.

Although sometimes referring to the present, this tense more often refers to something that might happen in the future. It can be translated "can", "could", "may", or "might":
"Could you help me?"
"Could I borrow your bike?"
"Ride the bike carefully, in case you crash into a tree."
"I am scared that he might hit me."

The negative has tones on the tense-marker and penultimate:  "I can't help"; there is an alternative pronunciation: .
"I can't agree to that."

The relative clause form of this tense has tones on the first and penultimate syllables:
."There is nothing he can do."

Frequently this tense is used with the verb  "be able":
"You can go home."

The aspect-marker  can be added to this tense:  "he might one day help".

In conditional clauses referring to a hypothetical situation in the future,  can mean "would". (See below.)

Perfect Potential
There is a tone on the second syllable of the tense-marker. The meaning is "I would have done", "I could have done".
"I would have helped."

The negative is  "I would not have helped".
"He had no option but to run away." (Literally, "he couldn't have done differently.")

Sometimes the aspect-marker  is added to this tense to make it imperfective. It adds an extra tone on the penultimate:
"I would be helping; I could have been helping".
"They are depriving us of the opportunity to do small businesses which we Malawians could have been doing ourselves."

The aspect markers  and  may also be added:  "I would have helped later".
"He knew that if anything were to happen, it would cause him problems later."

Further information is given under Conditional Clauses below.

Subjunctive

Present subjunctive
When an object-marker is added to the subjunctive, there is another tone following the object-marker, e.g. "please explain to me". In shorter verbs the tones are:  "please help me",  "please give me",  "please eat them".

The subjunctive usually expresses "either an order, or a wish, or an invitation to do something." It can be a polite form of the imperative, or be used as the imperative of the 3rd person, or make suggestions for the 1st person:
"Please give it to me."
"Let him come at once!" (an order, not permission).
"Where should we go?"
"The Government should do something about it."

 "Let's go and swim!"

The negative, which has the negative-marker  after the subject-marker, has a single tone on the penultimate:
"He shouldn't come tomorrow."

The subjunctive can also be used in various subordinate clause constructions, for example to express purpose or a wish or an indirect command:
"I lent him the bicycle so that he would arrive quickly."
"I want you to come tomorrow."
"We told them to sleep." (lit. "that they should sleep")

Other clauses where the subjunctive can be used are those where the meaning is "such as", and, as an alternative to an infinitive, after  "instead of":
 "I won't have time to chat with him." (lit. "such as I may chat")
"Instead of mending the bicycle, he has completely broken it."

It can also be used with the relative clause intonation, after  "if" and when the meaning is "if it should be the case that...":
"If you like this song you are about to hear..."

Another situation where the subjunctive is used is after  'although':
"I'll go whether it rains or not."

Future subjunctive
If  is added to the subjunctive it refers to something that should happen or which may happen later. Sometimes it is used in purpose clauses:
"I popped them (my shoes) in the car so that I could put them on later when I go into Shoprite."
"She wants to come here so that she can see me.

It can express a wish for the future:
"One day he wants to show the pictures which he has been taking."
"It is the aim of this school to teach those who (it is hoped) in future may help farmers."

It can also be used for an event which might or might not happen in future:
"He hasn't yet decided what he might do when he grows up."
"It's impossible that I should be alone on Valentine's Day."
"A day will come when you and I may meet each other."

A further use is in certain kinds of temporal clauses referring to the future, for which see below.

Subjunctive with 
The aspect-marker  means "go and...". It is often added to the subjunctive to indicate something which is desired to happen or which may happen at another place. It can be used in a purpose clause:
"We hurried to join the queue so that we could find some petrol."
"My journey was to Chilomoni so that I could meet a certain girl."

It can also be an indirect command or a wish:
"I asked her to dance (that we should go and dance)."
."Sautso received a message that he should go and meet them."
"She wants me to accompany her to Shoprite; there are things she wants to buy there."

It can refer to something which might happen at another place:
"I was beginning to think about the things which I might find when I arrived at the village."

Another use for this tense is in temporal clauses referring to the future, for which see below.

subjunctive (necessitative)
An imperfective form of the subjunctive is made by adding the tense-marker . It is referred to by Downing and Mtenje as the "necessitative" tense. The final vowel is :  "I should be helping".

This tense can express an obligation that should be carried out regularly or at all times, or as a "habit or general requirement":
 "You must (always) respect your parents."

Just as with the ordinary subjunctive, it can also be used in purpose clauses after  "that":
 "I bought the phone so that I could be keeping in touch with my friends."

Another of its uses is to express a "strong obligation equivalent to an order" (Salaun):
 "That man should go home!"

The negative of this tense is expressed not with  but by adding  to the negative subjunctive:

"My parents taught me that I should never be cruel to women and that I should always look after my wife."

Continuative subjunctive
Another kind of subjunctive, much less common than the two described above, is a tense with the aspect-marker  (pronounced , with a second tone on the penultimate) which means "let's do it while waiting for something else to happen":
."The teacher hasn't come yet; let's go and play meanwhile."
"Right now, come on, let's have a drink meanwhile."
"They told the people that they should carry on making preparations while the chiefs went to inform the senior chief."

It seems possible that  has developed by contraction from the construction  "begin" plus the perfect participle described above.

subjunctive
A form of the verb with  can be used to express sentences of the kind "Let me do it" or "May I do it", referring to an action which the speaker would like to see done at once. There is a tone on the syllable after . Unlike the more common participial , there is no tone on the first syllable:
"Let me see!"
"Let me ask you one thing."

These same three prefixes, and  can also be added to the imperative, with similar meanings (see below).

Imperative

Basic Imperative
The imperative is the command form of the verb. In Chichewa its basic form consists of the verb stem and final vowel . The suffix  is added to make it plural or more respectful. The imperative is toneless unless the verb-stem itself has a tone:
"Go and fetch the car!" (familiar, 2nd person singular)
 "Go well!" (plural or respectful) (root ) (more polite, using the plural )
"Stay well!" (root )

If the verb-stem is monosyllabic, however, such as  "eat", a supporting  is added before it:
( is added for politeness.)

An idiom "very widespread" among Bantu languages, according to Meeussen, is that if a series of commands is given, usually only the first is imperative, the second and third being subjunctive. This usually happens in Chichewa too:
"Take out your money, put it on the ground, and be off!"
"Come and see."

Imperative with object-marker
"Help me!"

But in verbs of one or two syllables, there is a single tone on the penultimate:
 (or simply )"Give me!"
"Eat it!"

The imperative can be made less direct by adding the suffix , which puts a tone on the syllable before it:
"Give me some, please."

Imperative with other prefixes
The Imperative can also take the aspect-markers  "go and" and  "come and".
"Go and call your friend."
"Come and see!"

These two are derived from the imperative of the auxiliary verbs  "go" and  "come" plus the subjunctive; so that  is derived from  "come so that you may see".

The prefix  "just" can also be added, with the supporting vowel . In this case the final vowel is always  and there is a tone on the syllable after :
"Just come!"

It puts a tone on the following syllable:
 "Please come (now)!"

This imperative with  can have an object-prefix added to it (the final vowel remains -a):
 "Please put it (the fire) out!"

 (pronounced ) and  put a tone on the penultimate syllable (not counting the plural suffix ). These are less commonly used:
"Carry on warming yourselves in the sun (while I fetch the teacher)."
"Keep on reading."

Negative Imperative
"Don't eat those bananas."
"Don't eat those bananas."

Adding the aspect-marker  to either of these gives the meaning "don't keep on doing..." or "never do". The final vowel of the negative subjunctive is usually :
"Don't keep on doing stupid things!"
"Don't keep telling lies, please!"

Infinitive
The Infinitive is formed with the prefix , which is proclitic, that is, it puts a tone on the syllable following itself:  "to help". The negative is made by adding  after , and has a single tone on the penultimate:  "not to help".

Ordinary uses of the Infinitive
The Infinitive can be used as the subject of a verb, in which case it is translated as a gerund:
"Smoking damages the health."

It can also be the object of verbs such as "want", "be able", "like", "know how to" and so on:
"I want to go."
"I can't come."
"I know how to type."

With the infix  or  the Infinitive can be used to express purpose, following a verb of going or coming respectively:
"I am going home to wash some clothes."
"I have come to see you."

But  with the Infinitive can also simply have a future meaning, referring to an event or situation in the distant future:
"I don't want to have a lot of children (lit. to be in future with a lot of children)."

The infinitive also often has the habitual aspect-marker , which adds an additional tone on the penultimate.
"That lady began to visit the house regularly."
"She won't be able to keep on paying the fees for me."
"The children don't go to school but help their parents."
"I used to steal cars and go and sell them in Mozambique."

 can also be added in sentences like the following that describe an event which takes place gradually:
"If you don't want to wait, you can be on your way."
"In that place various young men gradually began arriving."

Another idiomatic use of the Infinitive is to represent the second of two verbs in the same tense which have the same subject. The Infinitive is preceded by  "and" (or after a negative  "but"). The word  is often shortened to :
"People harvest maize and roast it."
"These thieves broke into a police station and beat up the policemen."

"He fell from his bike and broke his leg."

Sometimes the Infinitive can be used as a tense in its own right, to create a vivid description:
 "Wajabu gets the ball, dribbles it, and passes to Keegan."
"Brother, they say that the white man stood there and fired his gun, and that witch doctor was just laughing."

"I have had difficulty in getting here."

Adjectival Infinitive
The Infinitive is frequently combined with  "of" to make a verbal adjective or adverb. The syllables  and  usually merge to become a high-toned , except when the verb is monosyllabic, when they usually remain separate.

Frequently this form of the Infinitive is used as an adjective or adjectival participle:
 "The road going (which goes) to Mwanza."
"Are you married?"
"A beautiful bicycle."

It can also be used as a noun, with the noun it agrees with understood:
"Clothes." (lit. "(things) of wearing")
"Thieves." (lit. "(people) of stealing")
"Exit." (lit. "(place) of going out")
"The driver of the car." (lit. "(the person) of driving the car")

"Rapidly (lit. "in (a manner) of hurrying")
"Without any haste."

The prefix  (with a high tone) can also sometimes be used as an adverb.  usually means "soon" or "after a short time" (literally, "(at a time) of not being delayed"):
."He's coming shortly." 
."Soon the vehicle began to move."
"Rain will fall soon."

Whereas the longer form  usually means "a short time ago". It is often used with the perfect or remote perfect tense:
"I saw Hare a few moments ago."
."Some people have just entered a moment ago."
"He moved away a while ago; he's gone to Thyolo."

The verb  "think" combined with the  form of the Infinitive is a common way of saying "decide to":
"I decided to go to the police."

The negative Infinitive with  has various uses. It can be a command:
"Do not enter."

At other times it is an adverb:
"Without realising."

It can also be a noun:
"Blind people."

The word  (from the irregular verb  "say") is frequently used to mean "not":
"Women, not men."

Participial tenses
These tenses occur only in dependent clauses. They generally have relative clause intonation, that is, with a high tone on the subject-marker. In their usage they resemble participles in European languages, but differ from them in that they have a personal subject.

This tense is resembles a present participle in meaning:  "while (I am/was) helping". It is formed like the Present Continuous, but with a tone on the first syllable as well as the third (the two tones link into a plateau). It can refer to the subject, object, or another noun in the sentence:
"While I was walking I saw a man climbing a tree."

The verb  is again an exception, since in this tense it has no , but merely a tone on the first syllable:
"He was very sick when he was a child."

A negative of this tense is sometimes found, made with the negative-marker , which follows the subject-marker:
"Without his realising."

The negative is often replaced by the negative verbal adjective starting with :  "without realising".

The Persistive Present with  etc. can also be used in a dependent form, especially with the verb . In this case there is also a tone on the initial syllable:
 "I began when I was still at school."

A frequent use is in the phrase  "at the present time" (lit. "it still being now").
"He is not available at present."

The meaning is usually "after doing something":
"After getting up, she went to the market."
"When he arrived we had already left." (lit. "He found us having left.")
"We will finish this work after you've left."

Combined with the aspect-marker , it can mean "as soon as":
"As soon as the boy appeared, all the other boys shouted mockingly."

It can also be combined with the verbs  and  "be" to make compound tenses:
"When I arrived home, (I found that) he had written two letters."
"By now the sun had sunk very low."
"At this time of year people have generally finished clearing the fields."

The phrase  with  means "by this time':
"By this time he had already eaten."
"By this time all her friends had already got married."
"By this time darkness had come over the place and most of the minibus drivers had finished work."

Often this tense is used following a verb of wishing, when the thing wished for is unrealisable:
"He wished he could be like his friend."

Another use is in conditional sentences (see below).

It appears from Watkins (1937) that the tense-marker  derives from a compound tense formed with the verb  "say" which has fused into a single verb. Thus  "after his hunger was satisfied" derives from an earlier .

"before doing". It can be used of past or future time:
"He wants to plant the seed before the rain comes."
"Last night I had gone to bed before my brother came."

It can be combined with a past tense of :
."He had not yet married."
"They were things such as I had never seen before."

In contexts such as the following it means "since":
"It's been a while since we won the cup." (lit. "time has gone our not having taken the cup")
"It's been a long time indeed since I saw him."

Temporal clauses
The tenses used in these clauses are often idiomatic, differing from those used in similar clauses in English. In most cases the verb in the temporal clause takes the relative clause intonation with a tone on the first syllable.

"When"

If the main clause describes a situation in the past which was in progress at the time of an event described by a "when" clause, the verb in the "when" clause usually uses an imperfective tense, as in the examples below:
. "He was getting dressed when I entered (lit. was entering)."
"I had already eaten when he arrived (lit. was arriving)."
"John was winning the race when he fainted (lit. was fainting)."
"When he woke up (lit. was waking up) it was morning."

However, when there are two events, one following the other, the perfect tense is used in the "when" clause:
"When he entered, he found his mother was lying on the floor."

The phrase  means "this is when" or "it was at this point that...":
"This is when we got involved and locked them up in jail."

Other tenses are possible in temporal clauses; for example, the following, which refer to a future time, use the future subjunctive:
"When you see him, your hearts will be satisfied."
"There's no phone network so we won't be able to talk to our friends all the time that we'll be there."
"You will have eaten by the time I get to your house."

The following, also referring to an event in the distant future, use the future continuous subjunctive :
"He will have finished clearing the field by the time the rain starts."
"By the time that uncle of yours gets to know, you will be already settled."

The following, describing an event later today, uses the continuous subjunctive :
"By the time you reach home, that friend of yours will have stopped breathing."

"Since"
There is a single tone on the penultimate syllable (not counting ):
"Since getting up I haven't yet had a bath."
"Since you began selling, how much profit have you made?"

The subject of the verb can either be put in front of it or added afterwards with :
"It's been a long time since that country won the World Cup."
"We've been sad ever since our father died."

The same form of the verb with  can also mean "still" or "always".

Another way of expressing "since" is to use  "to begin from" or  "to come from", followed by a dependent clause verb:
"All these things I have been following since I was a child."

 or  can also be used:
"I've been farming this land for 20 years, since the time when my parents passed away."

"Until"
This can be followed by an infinitive. The meaning is "to the extent that", "so much so that". The subject of the infinitive can be included:
"He and his girlfriend quarrelled so much that eventually the girlfriend ended the relationship."
."He took a knife and sharpened it on a stone until he made it gleam."

"They carried on waiting until it was time to go home."

It may also be followed by the  participial tense, when the meaning is "until after":
"Make use of a condom until you know your HIV status."

When referring to an event in future which might or might not happen, a future subjunctive or potential tense is used:
"The lady insisted that she would not pay any money or get off the minibus until they reached Chilimba."
"People who break the law should be held by the police until such time as they are sentenced in a court."

Another common way of expressing "until" is to use the infinitive  "to arrive at the point where":
"The marriage went very well until the time when the husband received a strange message."

Conditional clauses
As well as the participial tenses described above, Chichewa also has a series of tenses meaning "if" or "when", which are used as the equivalent of conditional or temporal clauses.

The tense , when it is toneless, can be translated "if" or "when". It usually refers to future time:
"I'll ring when I get there."
"If I leave him, he'll get sick again."
"If you refuse, I shall shout."

There is no negative, but a negative meaning can be expressed with the verb  "be without":
"If I don't invite him, he won't come."

The same tense with  refers to a time "far in the future":
"When I get rich I shall buy a big house."
"If we need you at some future date, we'll call you."

This tense means "if ever" or "whenever". Unlike  it refers to past or present time according to context.
"Whenever you talk to me, you make me happy."
"Whenever he used to get on a bus, he would always choose one with a good music system."

"Whenever he received money, he used to buy the girl a present."

To refer to a situation in the future, the aspect-marker  can be added:
"She told him that if ever he were passing through Chitakale in future he should stop by at her house."

As well as meaning "after", the participial tense  can also have the meaning "if", referring to a hypothetical situation in the future. The main clause will often use  or  "be able":
"If someone stepped in front of the car, could you brake in time?"
"If you were to cut (this root) with your clothes on, what would happen?"
"Even if you were to deny it, there's no one who would believe you."
"It would be good if you could get here quickly."

Another possibility is to use  (lit. "if I were to say") with the subjunctive:
"If you were to see that lady, you might be surprised."

The main clause has a tone on the second syllable of the infix:
"If he had known, he wouldn't have done it."
."If I had called him, he would have come."
"If you had gone to hospital, you would have got better quickly."

A compound expression is also found, using  in place of "if":
"If I were still at work, I wouldn't be here."

An "if" clause alone can also mean "should have" or "if only":
"You should have told me at once." (lit. "if only you had told me...")
"If only he'd listened to his grandparents' advice!"

The same tense can be used when wishing for some past hypothetical situation:
."He wishes he'd been born somewhere else."

For a negative condition, the verb  ("be without") is used in the "if" clause:
"If I hadn't called him, he wouldn't have come."

Sometimes, instead of using  in the main clause, the word  "it would be the case that" or  "it would not be the case that" is used, followed by a participial verb:
"If you had gone to hospital, you would have got better quickly."

"If it were you, what would you have done?"

Sentences with  usually refer to the past. However, sometimes if  is used, the reference can be to a hypothetical situation in the present:
"If it were not for me, where would you be?"

The main clause in a hypothetical conditional can also be expressed using the word  "it would be the case that" followed by a participial tense:
"If it were a mongoose (stealing the chickens), we would be seeing its torn off fur."

"If the midwives were still working, I would have gone there."

The negative is :
."If it had been me, I wouldn't have accepted the documents."

In some varieties of Chichewa the tense-marker  can be used in the "if" clause in hypothetical conditional sentences referring to present time instead of :

"If only you would explain!"

."If that jealousy were dirt, it would be dirt which doesn't feel soap."

The form  or  can mean "if" in a hypothetical conditional:
"I would show you if I had any."

The words  and  followed by a participial tense can be used in the main clause instead of :
"If the police hadn't caught these thieves, it would have brought many problems."

"Were it not for the traditional doctor, this boy would not be alive."

("if")
Another way of making a condition is to use the conjunction  "if", followed by the relative clause intonation. This is in fact the only way conditions can be expressed with the verb . 
"He should not go to the meeting if he's not well."

 can also be used to make indirect questions:
"I don't know if he's there."

 can also be followed by a subjunctive with relative clause intonation:
"If you like this music you are hearing, press * to buy it."

 can be combined with :
"He knew that if anything had happened inside his compound, it would have caused him problems later."

 can also mean "as if", but in this case it is not followed by the relative clause intonation:
"He heard a hen shrieking as if it had seen something frightening."

Wishes
."Everyone would very much like to be eating enough fish to have a healthy body."
"He wished he could have a child."
"He wished the ground would swallow him up."

Wishes for the future are not always unfulfillable:
"He would like one day to be a farmer like his father."

Just as in conditional clauses, the auxiliary verb  is used to make the clause negative:
"You will wish you had never been born."
"I wished I had set off in the morning of that day because then I wouldn't have arrived in town after dark."
"He wished at this moment he had had the strength."

Indirect statements
In English, as in some other languages, a verb in an indirect statement usually goes into the past tense when the main verb is in the past tense. However, in Chichewa this rule does not apply and sentences such as the following, in which there is no change of tense in the dependent clause, are common:
"They thought that he was drunk (lit. he has become drunk)."
"He told me that he wasn't well (lit. isn't well)."

In the same way, the participial tenses can refer to a present, past, or future situation according to the tense of the main verb which they are used:
"I found them (while they were) praying."
."l might find them having already eaten."

"To be"
There are several verbs used for expressing different tenses of the verb "to be".

and 
This word is used for permanent states or identity:
"Water is important."
"The book which is on the table is mine."
"Walking at night isn't good."

The toneless  "is" is to be distinguished from  "with", "and", which has a tone. Sometimes  is shortened to :
"What would happen?" (lit. "the thing that would happen is what?")

The n in these combinations is homorganic, but (unlike in words such as  'snake') syllabic:

 (= )"This man is a liar."
 (= )."This illness is infectious."

The w part of a labialised consonant disappears before o and u:
 (= )."This man is bad."

 can have pronominal endings attached to it, e.g.  "I am",  "you are". The first and second persons are toneless; all the other endings have a tone, e.g.  "they are":
"I am a teacher."
"I am not a teacher."
"This is what causes problems."

The verb  is irregular and has very few tenses. In the present tense is used mainly for temporary states and for location, but other tenses have a more general usage, since  has no past tense.

In the present simple tense it is irregular, since there is no tone on the subject prefix:
"He's fine."
"Where is he?"

The Recent Past refers to situations of today:
"Where were you? / Where have you been?"

This refers to a time further in the past. It can refer to a situation which later changed:
"She came with a letter of transfer from Nsipu school where she had been previously."

It is also often used in story-telling:
"It was a Saturday at 9 o'clock in the morning."

Often the pronunciation  is heard, apparently with the same meaning as :
"Who was your teacher?"

The Persistive has a tone on the final syllable:  "I am still".
"Your brother is still alive."

Negative forms also exist except for the Persistive tense:  "I am not",  "I was not".
"They are (he is) not in Lilongwe."
"I wasn't at the meeting."

"I have"
The phrase  (lit. "I am with") means "I have".
"I have two children."
"We had a meeting of all the farmers."

The negative is  "I do not have".
"I don't have any children."

Locative forms
"Are there churches here?"
"There are several reasons."
"How many people are there in here?"

"He discovered that his wife wasn't at home."
"There is no one who answered" i.e. "No one answered." 
"There is no money in the car."

These can also be used in the past tense:
"In the old days there was no school here."
.
Of these,  is the most common:
 –  / "Is your father here?" – "Yes, he is." / "No, he isn't here."

In a relative clause
When  is used in a relative clause, it has a tone on the prefix:
"Stay where you are and don't move!"
"Fire goes where there is bush." (Proverb)

There is also an applied form ending in  used in phrases of manner, which also has the relative clause intonation:
"The way things are in this country."
"I would be delighted if one day he were to become a soldier like my father was."

Participial tenses
With the relative clause intonation  often serves as a participial tense. Thus  means "while I am" or "while I was":
"The wedding took place while I was at school."

A negative participial form  exists, although it is rarely used:
"These wives wanted you to find them not being pregnant."

The participial form is also found in the common phrase  "every", literally "it being everyone". It can be singular or plural:
"Everyone was very pleased."
"It takes place once every four years."

A persistive participial form  (or ) also exists meaning "while I am still" or "while I was still":
"I began when I was still at school." 
 (or )"At the moment" (lit. "it still being now")

For the infinitive, imperative, subjunctive, and all other tenses of "to be", the verb  ("sit" or "stay") is used:

Imperative:
"Be quiet!"

Infinitive:
"Who could it be?"

Present Subjunctive:
."Everyone should eat fish regularly so that he can be healthy."

Present Habitual:
."A rotten fish usually has a lot of germs."

Near Future:
"You'll be OK tomorrow."

Remote Future:
"We will have children one day."

Perfect:
."I've been married for five years."

Counterfactual conditional:
"If it had been you, what would you have done?"

Past Potential:
"If it were not for me, where would you be?"

When  is used with the infix , it can mean "happen" or "become":
"How did it happen that you came to Malawi?"

Compound tenses
Compound tenses are also found in Chichewa. Among them are the following:

Compound tenses with 
 can be followed by an infinitive:
"I'm feeling fine."
"I didn't know."

But a participial tense is also sometimes used:
"The rain was still falling."

"He had already eaten."
"He had just come out of prison."

With a verb like  "dress in", where the perfect tense describes a present situation, this tense describes a past situation:
"They were all dressed in red and were singing."
"He was carrying a  board."
"The lady was carrying a child on her back."

."He hadn't paid rent to the owners of the house for five months."
."He had not yet married."
"He had never seen such a beautiful woman."

Compound tenses with 
 is generally combined with one of the participial tenses. It can translate the perfect or pluperfect continuous:
"I have been waiting for you for three years."
"He had been saving up money for a long time."

It can also translate the future perfect tense:
"We will have eaten the pumpkins."
"You will have eaten."

"Whenever she goes to school she is usually carrying bags of food of different kinds." 
"By the time it's 4 o'clock these people have usually already gathered at bottle stores."
"At this time these students have usually not yet written their exams."

Compound tenses with 
The verb  "say", followed by one of the subjunctive tenses, makes a future in the past:
"We were going to eat pumpkins."
"When he was about to get on the bus, the conductor told him that he couldn't get on with a chicken."

Other ways of expressing the future in the past are to add  to the Past Imperfective tense ( "I was about to help") or to use  "want" with the Infinitive ( "I was wanting to help").

Compound tenses with 
The verb  "do" can be used in various tenses followed by an Infinitive, e.g.:
"He used to say insistently."
"The indications are that she was murdered."
"Sweet potatoes don't require many things for their cultivation."

The difference in meaning, if any, between this and the simple form of the verb is not clear.

The verb  (or sometimes ) is also frequently used in colloquial Chichewa in various tenses to make English borrowed words into Chichewa verbs:
"He had just recently retired from work."

A further auxiliary verb,  "walk, go", is mentioned by Watkins in the form Present Simple plus Infinitive; it was used in narrative with the meaning "and then" ( "he then went"). However, this verb is no longer used as an auxiliary in current standard Chichewa.

See also 

 Chichewa tones

Bibliography

Batteen, Christopher (2012). "The structure of the do/make construction in Chichewa and Chichewa/English". Studies in the Linguistic Sciences: Illinois Working Papers 2012: 1–16.
Chibambo, Mackenzie I. (2008) [2006]. Nkhokwe ya Malamulo a Chichewa. 2nd edition. CLAIM, Malawi.
Comrie, Bernard (1978) [1976]. Aspect. Cambridge University Press.
Downing, Laura J.; Al D. Mtenje (2017). The Phonology of Chichewa. Oxford University Press.
Funnell, Barry J. (2004)."A Contrastive Analysis of Two Varieties of Sena". MA dissertation, University of South Africa. (Introduction)
Gray, Andrew; Lubasi, Brighton; Bwalya, Phallen (2013). Town Nyanja: a learner's guide to Zambia's emerging national language.
Hyman, Larry M. & Al D. Mtenje (1999a). "Prosodic Morphology and tone: the case of Chichewa" in René Kager, Harry van der Hulst and Wim Zonneveld (eds.) The Prosody-Morphology Interface. Cambridge University Press, 90–133.
Hyman, Larry M. & Al D. Mtenje (1999b). "Non-Etymological High Tones in the Chichewa Verb", Malilime: The Malawian Journal of Linguistics no.1.
Kamwendo, Gregory H. (1999). "Work in Progress: The Monolingual Dictionary Project in Malawi", Malilime: The Malawian Journal of Linguistics no.1.
Kanerva, Jonni M. (1990). Focus and Phrasing in Chichewa Phonology. New York, Garland.
Katsonga-Woodward, H. (2012). Chichewa 101. Zumex Press.
Kishindo, Pascal, (2001). "Authority in Language: The Role of the Chichewa Board (1972–1995) in Prescription and Standardization of Chichewa". Journal of Asian and African Studies, No. 62.
Kiso, Andrea (2012). Tense and Aspect in Chichewa, Citumbuka, and Cisena. Stockholm University Ph.D. thesis.
Kulemeka, Andrew T. (2002). Tsinde: Maziko a Galamala ya Chichewa, Mother Tongue editions, West Newbury, Massachusetts.
Mapanje, J.A.C. (1983) On the Interpretation of Aspect and Tense in Chiyao, Chicheŵa, and English. University College London Ph.D. thesis.
Louw, Johan K. (1987). Pang'onopang'ono ndi Mtolo: Chichewa: A Practical Course. UNISA Press.
Maxson, Nathaniel (2011). Chicheŵa for English Speakers: A New and Simplified Approach. Assemblies of God Literature Press, Malawi.
Mchombo, Sam (2004). Syntax of Chichewa. Cambridge University Press.
Meeussen, A. E. "Bantu Grammatical Reconstructions". Africana Linguistica 3, 1967. pp. 79–121. ( Alternative link.)
Moto, Francis (1983). "Aspects of Tone Assignment in Chichewa", Journal of Contemporary African Studies, 3:1.
Mtenje, Al D. (1986). Issues in the Non-Linear Phonology of Chichewa part 1. Issues in the Non-Linear Phonology of Chichewa part 2. PhD Thesis, University College, London.
Mtenje, Al D. (1987). "Tone Shift Principles in the Chichewa Verb: A Case for a Tone Lexicon", Lingua 72, 169–207.
Mtenje, Al D. (1995). "Tone Shift, Accent and the Domains in Bantu: the Case of Chichewa", in Katamba, Francis. Bantu Phonology and Morphology: LINCOM Studies in African Linguistics 06.
Ngoma, Sylvester J.L.; Amos, M. Chauma (2011). Tizame M'Chichewa: Malamulo Ophunzitsira ndi Kuphunzitsira Chichewa. Bookland International, Blantyre.
Paas, Steven (ed.) (2016). Oxford Chichewa-English English-Chichewa Dictionary. Oxford University Press.
Plungian, Vladimir A. & Johan van der Auwera (2006). "Towards a typology of discontinuous past marking." Sprachtypol. Univ. Forsch. (STUF), Berlin 59, 4, 317–349.
Salaun, Rev. Fr. Noel (1993) [1969]. Chicheŵa Intensive Course, 3rd edition. Likuni Press and Publishing House, Malawi.
Scott, David Clement & Alexander Hetherwick (1929). Dictionary of the Nyanja Language.
Scotton, Carol Myers & Gregory John Orr, (1980). Learning Chichewa, Bk 1. Learning Chichewa, Bk 2. Peace Corps Language Handbook Series. Peace Corps, Washington, D.C.
Stevick, Earl et al. (1965). Chinyanja Basic Course. Foreign Service Institute, Washington, D.C.
Watkins, Mark Hanna (1937). A Grammar of Chichewa: A Bantu Language of British Central Africa, Language, Vol. 13, No. 2, Language Dissertation No. 24 (Apr.-Jun., 1937), pp. 5–158.

References

Nyasa languages
Languages of Malawi
Languages of Zambia
Tonal languages
Tone (linguistics)
tones
Niger-Congo grammars
Verbs by language